Wiston Daniel Fernández Queirolo (born 4 January 1998) is a Uruguayan professional footballer who plays as a midfielder for Danubio, on loan from Boston River.

Club career
An academy product of Defensor Sporting, Fernández made his professional debut on 18 September 2017 while being on loan at Boston River. He came on as a 71st minute substitute for Robert Mario Flores, as his side won the match 1–0 against El Tanque Sisley. He scored his first goal on 6 May 2018 in a 2–1 league win against Racing Club.

In August 2021, Fernández joined Danubio on a short term loan deal until the end of the year.

International career
Fernández is a former Uruguay youth international and has represented his nation at under-17 and under-20 levels. He was also part of under-17 team which participated at 2015 South American U-17 Championship.

Career statistics

Club

References

External links
 

1998 births
Living people
Footballers from Montevideo
Uruguayan footballers
Association football midfielders
Uruguay youth international footballers
Uruguayan Primera División players
Uruguayan Segunda División players
Boston River players
Danubio F.C. players